Nicole Reinhardt (born 2 January 1986 in Lampertheim, Hesse) is a German sprint canoer who competed since 2003. She won a gold medal in the K-4 500 m event at the 2008 Summer Olympics in Beijing.

Reinhardt also won thirteen medals at the ICF Canoe Sprint World Championships with eight golds (K-1 500 m: 2005, 2011, K-2 200 m: 2007, K-1 4 × 200 m: 2009, 2010, 2011, K-2 500 m: 2007, K-4 200 m: 2005) and five silvers (K-2 200 m: 2009, K-2 500 m: 2009, K-4 200 m: 2006, K-4 500 m: 2009, 2010).

Reinhardt posed nude in the German edition of Playboy in August 2008, alongside compatriots Katharina Scholz, Petra Niemann and Romy Tarangul.

References

Canoe09.ca profile 
Chicago Tribune August 20, 2008 article on Reinhardt's desire to pose for Playboy- accessed 16 December 2008.

kanu.de profile 
Official website 

1986 births
Living people
People from Lampertheim
Sportspeople from Darmstadt (region)
Canoeists at the 2008 Summer Olympics
German female canoeists
Olympic canoeists of Germany
Olympic gold medalists for Germany
Olympic medalists in canoeing
ICF Canoe Sprint World Championships medalists in kayak
Medalists at the 2008 Summer Olympics